Renán Yoriel Addles Daniels (born 11 July 1989 in Colón, Panama) is a Panamanian footballer who currently plays as a striker for San Francisco FC.

Club career
A much-travelled forward nicknamed El Animal and Renaldinho, Addles has played for a number of South American teams in addition to local clubs such as Chorrillo, whom he joined aged 14, and Árabe Unido. In January 2010, he scored twice on his debut for Liga de Fútbol Profesional Boliviano side The Strongest against Nacional Potosí and he went on to score 10 goals in 30 games for them. In January 2012 he moved on to Aurora and after a season back home at Chorrillo, he moved abroad again to play for Chilean side Unión La Calera in the 2013 Clausura.

In summer 2014, Addles was snapped up by Plaza Amador only to return to Árabe Unido ahead of the 2015 Clausura.

International career
Addles made his debut for Panama in a February 2011 friendly match against Peru and has, as of 15 October 2015, earned a total of 9 caps, scoring no goals. He was a non-playing squad member at the 2011 CONCACAF Gold Cup.

References

External links
 
 
 Profile – Plaza Amador 

1989 births
Living people
Sportspeople from Colón, Panama
Association football forwards
Panamanian footballers
Panama international footballers
2011 CONCACAF Gold Cup players
Unión Deportivo Universitario players
C.D. Árabe Unido players
Atlético Huila footballers
The Strongest players
Club Aurora players
Unión La Calera footballers
C.D. Plaza Amador players
Chilean Primera División players
Categoría Primera A players
Panamanian expatriate footballers
Panamanian expatriate sportspeople in Chile
Expatriate footballers in Chile
Expatriate footballers in Bolivia
Expatriate footballers in Colombia